Mirko Remo Stangalino (born 18 August 1946) is an Italian ski mountaineer.

Together with Renzo Meynet and Osvaldo Ronc, he placed first in the civilian team category in the 1975 Trofeo Mezzalama edition, which was carried out as the first World Championship of Skimountaineering.

References 

1946 births
Living people
Italian male ski mountaineers
World ski mountaineering champions